Riverton High School is a high school in Riverton, Wyoming and forms part of the Fremont County School District Number 25. In 2017, it had an enrollment of 787 students and a faculty of 46 teachers in grades 9-12. In 2018, it had an enrollment of 766 students and a faculty of 47 teachers in grades 9-12.

References

 

Educational institutions in the United States with year of establishment missing
Public high schools in Wyoming
Schools in Fremont County, Wyoming
Riverton, Wyoming